TER Bourgogne was the regional rail network serving the Burgundy region of France. In 2017 it was merged into the new TER Bourgogne-Franche-Comté.

Network

Rail

Road

 13 Autun – Avallon
 16 Autun – Chagny
 17 Châtillon-sur-Seine – Montbard
 18 Clamecy – Avallon – Montbard

Rolling stock

SNCF Class Z 5600
SNCF Class Z 5300

See also

SNCF
Transport express régional
Réseau Ferré de France
List of SNCF stations in Burgundy
Burgundy

External links
 Official Site